Frank Andrew Ribar (born Hribar) (January 15, 1917 – October 1, 1976) was an American football guard in the National Football League for the Washington Redskins.  He played high school football at Aliquippa High School, in Aliquippa, Pennsylvania, and college football at Duke University, where he was All-American and a member of the 1938 Blue Devils team that was unscored upon during regular season (Claassen).  He was a member of the Southern team during the 1939 Blue and Gray football game.  He also competed in varsity boxing while at Duke (Chanticleer, 1940).  He was drafted by the Detroit Lions in the 18th round of the 1940 NFL Draft.  He also played for the Norfolk Shamrocks of the Dixie League, and on military teams.  He was inducted into the Aliquippa Sports Hall of Fame in 1975, and Beaver County Sports Hall of Fame in 2001.

References
Claassen, H. 1963. Football's Unforgettable Games. Ronald Press.

External links
Short biography at Beaver County Sports Hall of Fame web page
Duke University Chanticleer 1940
Spartanburg Herald Journal, December 10, 1939

1917 births
1976 deaths
People from Fayette County, Pennsylvania
American football guards
Players of American football from Pennsylvania
Duke Blue Devils football players
Washington Redskins players